The NATO Double-Track Decision was the decision by NATO from December 12, 1979 to offer the Warsaw Pact a mutual limitation of medium-range ballistic missiles and intermediate-range ballistic missiles. It was combined with a threat by NATO to deploy more medium-range nuclear weapons in Western Europe after the Euromissile Crisis.

Background 
The détente between the United States and the Soviet Union culminated in the signing of SALT I (1972) and the negotiations toward SALT II (1979). The agreements placed constraints on further developments in nuclear capacities.

The SALT agreements were not intended to be considered a form of mutual arms control but merely referred to strategic carrier systems and their warheads, which did not include any tactical nuclear weapons such as nuclear bombs delivered by bombers or midrange missiles (MRBMs and IRBMs).

Decision 

The decision was prompted by the continuing military buildup of Warsaw Pact countries, particularly their growing capability in nuclear systems threatening Western Europe. Of special concern was the growth of long-range theatre nuclear forces, with the SS-20 missile and the 'Backfire' bomber being singled out for particular concern.

The European NATO members saw in the mobile launching platform-mounted SS-20 missiles no less a threat than the strategic intercontinental missiles. On December 12, 1979, they took on the so-called NATO Double-Track Decision. It intended the deployment of 572 equally mobile American middle-range missiles (Pershing II and Gryphon BGM-109G Ground Launched Cruise Missile) to rebuild the state of Mutual Assured Destruction. NATO offered immediate negotiations with the goal to ban nuclear armed middle-range missiles from Europe completely, with the provision that the missiles could be installed four years later if the negotiations failed. The Soviets were critical of the fact that neither French nor British nuclear weapons had been considered in the treaty.

The disarmament negotiations which started on November 30, 1981, remained without conclusion. The German Bundestag agreed to the deployment in 1983, and the Soviet Union aborted the negotiations.

On December 8, 1987, the United States and the Soviet Union signed the Intermediate-Range Nuclear Forces Treaty. It provided for the destruction of all middle-range weapons and ended this episode of the Cold War.

References

External links
 Special Meeting of Foreign and Defence Ministers (The "Double-Track" Decision on Theatre Nuclear Forces) at nato.int
 The Euromissile Crisis

Cold War
Deterrence theory during the Cold War
NATO relations
Soviet Union–United States relations
1979 in international relations
December 1979 events in Europe
Arms control